Archaeoprepona meander, the Meander prepona, is a butterfly in the family Nymphalidae. It is found from Mexico to the Amazon basin.

Subspecies
Archaeoprepona meander meander (Suriname)
Archaeoprepona meander megabates (Peru, Bolivia, Panama, Colombia) three-toned prepona
Archaeoprepona meander phoebus (Honduras, Mexico)
Archaeoprepona meander castorina (Brazil)

External links
Butterflies of America

Charaxinae
Fauna of Brazil
Nymphalidae of South America
Butterflies described in 1775
Taxa named by Pieter Cramer